Emmanuel Chemengich is an Anglican bishop in Kenya: since 2018 he has been the Bishop of Kitale.

Notes

21st-century Anglican bishops of the Anglican Church of Kenya
Anglican bishops of Kitale
Year of birth missing (living people)
Living people